Turze may refer to the following places:
Turze, Greater Poland Voivodeship (west-central Poland)
Turze, Masovian Voivodeship (east-central Poland)
Turze, Silesian Voivodeship (south Poland)
Turze, Pomeranian Voivodeship (north Poland)
Turze, Drawsko County in West Pomeranian Voivodeship (north-west Poland)
Turze, Myślibórz County in West Pomeranian Voivodeship (north-west Poland)
Turze, Pyrzyce County in West Pomeranian Voivodeship (north-west Poland)